The School of Economics, Business and Accounting, also known as FEA-USP, is one of the departments of the University of São Paulo, a notable public university in the São Paulo, Brazil.

Founded in 1946, it is known as one of the most prestigious business schools of Brazil and Latin America in its fields.

Notable alumni
 Delfim Netto - former Brazilian Minister of Finance (1967–1974) under the brazilian military dictatorship
 Guido Mantega - former Brazilian Minister of Finance (2006–2014) under the office of Luiz Inácio Lula da Silva and Dilma Rousseff
 Zélia Cardoso de Mello- former Brazilian Minister of Finance (1990–1991) under the office of Fernando Collor de Mello
Alma - A French singer who studied here as an exchange student from IESEG School of Management in Lille. She participated in the Eurovision Song Contest in 2017, representing France, achieving twelfth place.

Notable faculty
Alice Piffer Canabrava

References

External links
 Feamais Alumni FEAUSP
 Faculdade de Economia, Administração e Contabilidade da USP
 CAVC Centro Acadêmico Visconde de Cairu
 Atlética FEA-USP 
 Bateria S/A 
 FEA Júnior
 Cursinho FEA-USP 
 Fundação Instituto de Administração (FIA)
 Fundação Instituto de Pesquisas Econômicas (FIPE)
 Fundação Instituto de Pesquisas Contábeis, Atuariais e Financeiras (FIPECAFI)

University of São Paulo
Business schools in Brazil
Economics schools
Educational institutions established in 1946
1946 establishments in Brazil